Moosbach may refer to:

Places 
 Moosbach, Austria, a town in the district of Braunau am Inn in Upper Austria
 Moosbach, Bavaria, a town in the district of Neustadt in Bavaria, Germany

Rivers 
 Moosbach (Lauter), a river of Rhineland-Palatinate, Germany, tributary of the Lauter
 Moosbach (Fichtenberger Rot), a river of Baden-Württemberg, Germany, tributary of the Fichtenberger Rot
 Moosbach (Mangfall), a river of Bavaria, Germany, tributary of the Mangfall